Blanc de Champagne is an alternate name for several wine grape varieties including:

Chardonnay
Luglienga
Pinot blanc
Shampanchik

Other uses
Blanc de blancs, a style of white Champagne or sparkling wine made only from white wine grapes